Hubert Hilscher (25 October 1924 - 19 September 1999) was a Polish graphic artist.

Biography 

Hubert Hilscher was born in a German family in Poland. In 1944 when he was 20 years old, he fought in the Warsaw Uprising as a soldier of the Home Army, under the pseudonym ‘Zaremba’.

The school merged with the Academy of Fine Arts in Warsaw in 1950. He graduated in 1955.

After graduating, Hilscher worked at WAG, a publishing house that provided patronage for poster designers. He served as its art director between 1961 and 1970.

In 1962, he served as art director for the bimonthly magazine Projekt until the magazine ceased production in 1983.

Hubert Hilscher died in 1999 at the age of 75. He is buried in Powązki Cemetery in Warsaw.

Major awards

1967 - Silver Medal at the International Tourist Poster Exhibition, Milan (Italy)
1973 - Prize of the Year in the Best Warsaw Poster competition, Warsaw (Poland)
1981 - Second prize at the 4th Poster Biennial, Lahti (Finland)

Gallery

See also 

 Cyrk (art)
 List of Polish graphic designers

References

External links 
 Profile of Hubert Hilscher at Culture.pl
 Hubert Hilscher at the MoMA
 Hubert Hilscher at the Victoria and Albert Museum
 Hubert Hilscher's Posters at ContemporaryPosters.com

1924 births
1999 deaths
Polish printmakers
Polish poster artists
Artists from Warsaw
Academy of Fine Arts in Warsaw alumni
Warsaw Uprising insurgents
Burials at Powązki Cemetery